The Miss Paraguay 2009 was held on July 10, 2009. The pageant was won by Mareike Baumgarten of Asunción. It was broadcast live on Telefuturo from the Sheraton Asunción. The winner represented Paraguay at the Miss Universe 2009 and Reina Hispanoamericana 2009. The winner of Miss Mundo Paraguay, Tamara Sosa will compete in the Miss World 2009. Romina Bogado was chosen as the Miss Internacional Paraguay and will go to the Miss International 2009 pageant. Tamara Sosa also competed at the Miss American Continent Pageant.

Results

Special Awards
Miss Congeniality - Rocío Segovia 
Miss Photogenic - Shirley Torres 
Best Face - Mareike Baumgarten

Delegates

Judges
The following persons judged the final competition.
Juan Sadi Padoin
Dra. Isabel Musi
Salvador Más
Sra. Amanda Palumbo
Sra. Ati Troche
Sra. Karina Buttner
Sandra Poletti

See also
Miss Paraguay
Paraguay at major beauty pageants

External links
Guaranian Beauties.
Official photos of the delegates.

2009
2009 beauty pageants
2009 in Paraguay
July 2009 events in South America